Near and Far Away is a 1976 Swedish drama film directed by Marianne Ahrne. Ahrne won the award for Best Director at the 13th Guldbagge Awards.

Cast
 Lilga Kovanko as Mania
 Robert Farrant as Mutist
 Jan-Eric Lindquist as Stenius
 Helge Skoog as Jaeger
 Annicka Kronberg as Annicka
 Bodil Mårtensson as Bente

References

External links
 
 

1976 films
1976 drama films
Swedish drama films
1970s Swedish-language films
Films whose director won the Best Director Guldbagge Award
1970s Swedish films